Camillo Isnardi (17 September 1874 – 17 January 1949) was an Italian sports shooter. He competed at the 1920 Summer Olympics and the 1924 Summer Olympics.

References

External links
 

1874 births
1949 deaths
Italian male sport shooters
Olympic shooters of Italy
Shooters at the 1920 Summer Olympics
Shooters at the 1924 Summer Olympics
Sportspeople from Turin
20th-century Italian people